Kwaku Dua Panin (born Fredua Agyeman;  – 27 April 1867) was the eighth Asantehene of the Ashanti Empire from 25 August 1834 until his death.

Early life 

In 1834, Kwaku Dua Panin succeeded Osei Yaw Akoto. His wives included Nana Takyiau and her sister, Nana Konadu Somprema.

Reign 
Witnessing the frequent human sacrifices in Ashanti, the Dutch were convinced that the Ashanti had vast manpower, some of which could be made available to the Royal Dutch Army. On 18 March 1837, Kwaku Dua Panin signed an agreement with King William I of the Netherlands to provide Ashanti recruits, a thousand of whom would join the Dutch East Indies Army within a year in exchange for guns.

Jacob Huydecoper, a Gold Coast Euro-African from Elmina, opened a recruitment agency in Kumasi to this end. As recruitment was still supposed to be voluntary, slaves offered to the recruiting agent received an advance payment – ostensibly to purchase their freedom. As part of the deal, two Ashanti princes, Kwasi Boachi—Kwaku Dua Panin's son—and Kwame Poku, were to be educated in the Netherlands. Boachi eventually graduated from the Royal Academy of Delft and became the first black mining engineer in the Netherlands who would go on to have a distinguished career in the East Indies. In 1841, Kwaku Dua was presented with a horse-drawn four wheeled carriage by Thomas Birch Freeman on behalf of the Wesleyan Missionary Society.

From 1841 to 1844, Kwaku Dua Panin fought against the Gonja and Dagomba to the north. In 1863, the Ashanti invaded territory to their south which was then under British protection, which soured relations with the British.

Kwaku Dua Panin died suddenly on 24 April 1867; he was succeeded by Kofi Karikari. Historian McCaskie writes that at the time of his death that year, the Adaka Kesie (The chest containing Ashanti's disposable currency reserves) was full with a value of nearly 180,000 mperedwan approximately £1,440,000 in the 19th century.

Infrastructure projects 
Kwaku Dua organized the construction of new streets to replace the old narrow streets of Kumasi for the convenience of his carriage. In 1841, he ordered for the construction of proper bridges across the streams of the metropolitan area.

References

Footnotes

Bibliography

External links 
 Kwaku Dua I at Dictionary of African Christian Biography

19th-century monarchs in Africa
1790s births
1867 deaths
Ashanti monarchs
Year of birth uncertain